Dylan Higgins (born April 5, 1991 in Harare, Zimbabwe) is a Zimbabwean cricketer who played 3 List A matches for Matabeleland Tuskers and Mid West Rhinos.His debut first class match saw him collect an impressive 11 wicket hall including 6 wickets in the first innings and 5 in the second innings. He was later selected to captain Zimbabwe at the International Cricket Council U19 World Cup in New Zealand.

He disappeared from the Zimbabwe cricket scene in 2010 and now, according to his LinkedIn profile, appears to be undertaking his Actuarial Exams in the UK.

References

External links
 

1991 births
Living people
Zimbabwean cricketers
Matabeleland Tuskers cricketers
Sportspeople from Harare